Laura Frank (born 3 August 1998) is a Danish footballer who plays as a defender for Elitedivisionen club Fortuna Hjørring. She has been a member of the Denmark women's national team.

References

1998 births
Living people
Danish women's footballers
Women's association football defenders
Fortuna Hjørring players
Denmark women's international footballers